Yulitza Meneses Prieto (born November 9, 1985 in Nueva Gerona) is a Cuban sprint canoeist.

Biography and career
She edged out the Argentine pair (led by Alexandra Keresztesi) by two thirds of a second (0.67) for the gold medal in the women's K-2 500 metres at the 2011 Pan American Games in Guadalajara, Mexico.

Meneses represented Cuba at the 2012 Summer Olympics in London, where she competed in the women's K-2 500 metres. Meneses and her partner Dayexi Gandarela paddled to a sixth-place finish and fourteenth overall in the B-final by approximately three seconds behind the Slovakian pair (Ivana Kmeťová and Martina Kohlová), posting their time of 1:50.124.

References

External links
NBC Olympics Profile

1985 births
Cuban female canoeists
Living people
Olympic canoeists of Cuba
Canoeists at the 2012 Summer Olympics
Canoeists at the 2011 Pan American Games
People from Nueva Gerona
Pan American Games gold medalists for Cuba
Pan American Games bronze medalists for Cuba
Pan American Games medalists in canoeing
Medalists at the 2011 Pan American Games